Theofelus is both a surname and a given name. Notable people with the name include:

Emma Theofelus (born 1996 or 1997), Namibian politician
Theofelus Eiseb (1956–2009), Namibian politician

See also
Theophilus

Surnames of African origin
African given names